Luis Perdomo (born February 19, 1971, in Caracas, Venezuela) is an American jazz pianist and composer.

Career
His style is influenced by Bud Powell, Oscar Peterson, McCoy Tyner, Paul Bley and Herbie Hancock. From the age of 12, was playing on Venezuelan TV and radio stations. His first teacher was the Austrian-born jazz pianist Gerry Weil.

"The biggest lesson I received from Gerry Weil in Venezuela was to keep my mind open to all types of music" he says. He eventually realized that he would have to travel to New York City to fulfill his musical destiny. "Being in a more competitive and challenging environment was a big change that I welcomed". He obtained a Bachelor of Music degree at the Manhattan School of Music, where he was a student of Harold Danko and classical pianist Martha Pestalozzi, and later on graduated with a master's degree from Queens College in New York City, where he studied with the legendary pianist Sir Roland Hanna. Luis also cites Jaki Byard as one of his teachers.

He has played with Ralph Irizarry and Timbalaye, Ray Barretto, David Sanchez, John Patitucci, Dave Douglas, Yosvany Terry, Brian Lynch, Tom Harrell, Henry Threadgill, David Gilmore, Steve Turre, David Weiss and Robin Eubanks among others. He has been a long-standing member of Miguel Zenon's quartet and was a member of Ravi Coltrane's quartet for 10 years.

In addition, he has appeared on over 120 recordings as a sideman, and has released nine CDs as leader: Focus Point in 2005, Awareness in 2006 (both on Coltrane's label RKM Music), Pathways in 2008 (Criss Cross Jazz), Universal Mind (and third for RKM Music) in 2012, The Infancia Project in 2012 (Criss Cross Jazz), Links in 2013 (Criss Cross Jazz) and Twenty-Two in 2015 (Hot Tone Music), This CD includes Perdomo's newest band: The "Controlling Ear Unit", with bassist Mimi Jones and drummer Rudy Royston, as well as "Montage" (Hot Tone Music) and "Spirits and Warriors" (Criss Cross Jazz) in 2016, which features an amazing band with Alex Sipiagin on trumpet, Mark Shim on saxophone, Ugonna Okegwo on bass and drummer Billy "Jabali" Hart.

Discography as leader
 Focus Point (RKM, 2005)
 Awareness (RKM, 2006)
 Pathways (Criss Cross, 2008)
 Universal Mind (RKM, 2012)
 The Infancia Project (Criss Cross, 2012)
 Links (Criss Cross, 2013)
 Twenty-Two (Hot Tone, 2015)
 Montage (Hot Tone, 2016)
 Spirits and Warriors (Criss Cross, 2016)

Selected Discography as sideman
With Tom Harrell
Oak Tree (HighNote Records, 2022)
With Miguel Zenon
Musica De Las Americas (Miel Music, 2022)
El Arte Del Bolero (Miel Music, 2021)
Sonero (Miel Music, 2019)
Tipico (Miel Music, 2017)
Identities are Changeable (Miel Music, 2014)
Alma Adentro:The Puerto Rican Songbook (Marsalis Music, 2011)
Esta Plena (Marsalis Music, 2009)
Awake (Marsalis Music, 2008)
Jibaro (Marsalis Music, 2005)
Ceremonial (Marsalis Music, 2004)
Looking Forward (Fresh Sounds New Talent, 2002)
With Ravi Coltrane
Spirit Fiction (Blue Note, 2012)
Blending Times (Savoy, 2009)
Influx (Savoy, 2007)
With David Sanchez
Carib (Stretch Music / Melaza Music / Ropeadope Records, 2019)
With Henry Threadgill
Double up plays Double up plus (PI, 2018)
With Ray Barretto
Homage to Art (Sunnyside, 2003)
With David Gilmore
From Here to Here (Criss Cross Jazz, 2019)
Energies Of Change (Evolutionary, 2016)
Numerology Live at the Jazz Standard (Evolutionary, 2013)
With Steve Turre
Woody's Delight (High Note Records, 2012)
With Jon Irabagon
Dr Quixotics Traveling Exotics (Irrabagast, 2018)
Behind The Sky (Irrabagast, 2015)
With Brian Lynch (musician)
Spheres of Influence Suite (EWECD 2008)
ConClave (Criss Cross Jazz, 2004)
With Ben Wolfe
Fatherhood (Resident Arts Records, 2019)
Live At Smalls (SL, 2010)
No Strangers Here (MaxJazz, 2008)
With Ralph Irizarry and Timbalaye
Timbalaye (Shanachie 1998)
Best Kept Secret (Shanachie 2000)
It's Time (BKS Records 2007)
With Gregg August
Dialogues On Race (Iacuessa Records 2020)
Four By Six (Iacuessa Records 2012)
One Peace (Iacuessa Records 2007)

References

External links

 Profile on All About Jazz
 March 25, 2005 Article on JazzTimes by John Murph
 [ Profile on All Music]
  June 11th, 2007 Interview at All About Jazz

List of Venezuelan Americans

American jazz composers
American male jazz composers
American jazz pianists
American male pianists
1971 births
Living people
Venezuelan pianists
Venezuelan jazz pianists
21st-century American pianists
21st-century American male musicians
Criss Cross Jazz artists